Sören Börjesson (born 14 March 1956) is a Swedish football manager and former player. He made five appearances for Sweden, 182 Allsvenskan appearances for Örgryte IS and 22 Allsvenskan appearances for Djurgårdens IF. After his active career, he became youth and assistant coach in Örgryte IS, later manager in the 2006 season.

He is the son of Helge Börjesson and nephew of Rune Helgesson who were also footballers.

Honours

Club
Örgryte IS
 Division 2 Södra: 1980
 Allsvenskan: 1985

Djurgårdens IF
 Division 1 Norra: 1987

Individual
 Allsvenskan Top Scorer: 1985

References

External links
 
 

Living people
1956 births
Association football midfielders
Swedish footballers
Sweden international footballers
Sweden under-21 international footballers
Sweden youth international footballers
Swedish football managers
Allsvenskan players
Örgryte IS players
Djurgårdens IF Fotboll players
Örgryte IS managers